Professor Ann E. Nicholson  (born June 1965), is Dean in the Faculty of Information Technology of Australia's largest university, Monash University in Melbourne. She is a leading international researcher in the specialised area of Bayesian networks.

Nicholson completed her BSc and MSc in Computer Science at the University of Melbourne. In 1988, she was awarded a Rhodes scholarship to Oxford. Here she did her doctorate in the Robotics Research Group. After starting work in the United States in 1992 as a post-doctoral research fellow at Brown University in Rhode Island, she took up a lecturing position at Monash University in 1994.

Nicholson has published more than 120 papers, with more than 7,000 citations, including co-authoring leading books in her specialised research area – Bayesian Artificial Intelligence.

Nicholson established the consulting company Bayesian Intelligence in 2007 and is currently serving as Honorary Secretary to the Victorian Rhodes Scholarship Selection Committee. In 2022 she was elected a Fellow of the Australian Academy of Technological Sciences and Engineering.

References

External links 

 List of her research publications 
 Short Interview with Nicholson via Women in STEMM Australia
 Interview on "Data Modelling with Bayesian networks" via YouTube
 Blog post "How to model with Bayesian networks"

University of Melbourne alumni
Alumni of the University of Oxford
Australian Rhodes Scholars
Academic staff of Monash University
Artificial intelligence researchers
Women computer scientists
Living people
1965 births

Fellows of the Australian Academy of Technological Sciences and Engineering
People educated at Mac.Robertson Girls' High School
Scientists from Melbourne
Australian expatriates in the United States